Still Life (American Concert 1981) is a live album by the English rock band the Rolling Stones, released on 1 June 1982. Recorded during the band's 1981 American tour, it was released in time for their 1982 European tour.

The album cover is a painting by Japanese artist Kazuhide Yamazaki, whose work inspired the tour's stage design.

Release and reception

The album was preceded by the release of a cover version of the Miracles' "Going to a Go-Go", which became a Top 30 hit in the United Kingdom and United States; the follow-up single, "Time Is on My Side", reached the lower part of the UK chart.

Still Life was a commercial success, reaching number 4 in the UK Albums Chart and number 5 in the U.S., and going Platinum in the U.S. and Canada, as well as Gold in the UK, but was not critically well-received, being admonished for sounding too slick and lacking any rough edges expected in a Rolling Stones performance.

In 1998, Still Life was remastered and reissued by Virgin Records, and again in 2010 by Universal Music. It was released on SHM-SACD in 2011 by Universal Music Japan.

Track listing

Personnel
The Rolling Stones
Mick Jagger – lead vocals, guitar
Keith Richards – guitar, backing vocals
Ronnie Wood – guitar, backing vocals
Bill Wyman – bass guitar
Charlie Watts – drums

Additional personnel
Ian McLagan – keyboards
Ian Stewart – piano
Ernie Watts – saxophone

Technical
Recorded by Bob Clearmountain and David Hewitt with the Record Plant Remote (New York)
Mixed by Bob Clearmountain at Power Station Studios
Front cover painting by Kazuhide Yamazaki
Mastered by Bob Ludwig at Masterdisk (original LP and 1998 remastered CD)

Charts and certifications

Charts

Weekly charts

Year-end charts

Singles

Certifications

See also
Let's Spend the Night Together (film)

References

1982 live albums
Albums produced by the Glimmer Twins
The Rolling Stones live albums
Rolling Stones Records live albums
Atlantic Records live albums
Virgin Records live albums